Black Canary is a DC Comics superhero. The character has appeared across a range of live-action and animated television shows, as well as in several video games. Originally the pseudo name of the character Dinah Drake, the mantle was later passed on to her daughter, Dinah Laurel Lance. Both characters have appeared in different comic continuations and in other media, but the character has also been known by other names. She is usually portrayed as a proficient fighter, using martial arts and as well as her trademark sonic scream or 'Canary Cry'.

Television

Live action

Legends of the Superheroes

In 1979, the character appeared in two television specials Legends of the Superheroes, where she was portrayed by Danuta Wesley. The special featured a host of DC comic characters, including Batman, portrayed by Adam West.

Birds of Prey
In 2002, Warner Bros. produced a short-lived television series Birds of Prey, broadcast on The WB. Set in New Gotham City seven years after the city has been apparently abandoned by Batman, it featured the characters of Helena Kyle / Huntress and Barbara Gordon / Oracle, alongside a teenage Dinah Redmond, (a re-imagined version of the Black Canary) who had psychic abilities. The character of Dinah was played by Rachel Skarsten, with the young version of Dinah played by AJ Michalka in the series' pilot episode.

Dinah's mother Caroline Lance, portrayed by Lori Loughlin appeared in the series as a retired superhero formerly known as the Black Canary, who was estranged from her daughter. Carolyn had the 'Canary Cry', which was activated by whistling, rather than screaming. The series suggests that Dinah may have inherited this ability from her mother, but this is never explored.

The series ran for thirteen episodes before being cancelled due to falling ratings.

Smallville
Black Canary is featured in the long running The CW series Smallville several times from the seventh season onwards, portrayed by Alaina Huffman.

In the series, she wore a long brunette wig, while acting as a controversial conservative columnist and talk-show host for the Daily Planet in Metropolis. By night, she used her metahuman ultrasonic scream to become a vigilante/mercenary. She was initially employed by Lex Luthor to capture the Green Arrow, who she believed to be a terrorist. She was later convinced that Luthor was lying to her, and Oliver asked her to join his team, Justice League. Black Canary helped in the search for Clark at the start of season 8, and agreed the group should disband once their identies were exposed. However, she returned later in the season to help bring down Doomsday.

In the season nine finale, Dinah rejoined the League in order to help in the war against the Kandorians. Her final appearance in the series saw her and the other heroes captured and put into a virtual reality stasis by the Vigilante Registration Agency (VRA). She fought alongside Oliver and Chloe Sullivan to free the others.

In addition, it is further suggested in the series that another woman had been a member of the Justice Society of America some decades previously under the name Black Canary.

Arrowverse
 

Multiple characters who adopt certain elements of Black Canary have appeared in The CW Arrowverse franchise.

 Dinah Laurel Lance, portrayed by Katie Cassidy, is first introduced in Arrow. first appearing in the pilot episode. Now an attorney, this version (referred to by her middle name) is Oliver Queen’s ex-girlfriend, and Detective Quentin Lance's older daughter. She is also the sister of Sara Lance. The character appears in several episodes of The Flash, Legends of Tomorrow and Vixen, all set in the same shared universe. During season three, Laurel takes over her sister’s mantle becoming "Black Canary", officially joining Oliver’s team. As Black Canary, she uses a black side-handle baton as her trademark weapon and later uses an updated version of her sister’s sonic "Canary Cry" device designed by Cisco Ramon. 
 An antagonistic version of the Laurel Lance from Earth-2 known as Black Siren (also played by Cassidy), appears in The Flash episode "Invincible". Unlike her Earth-1 counterpart, her sonic scream is a meta-human power. The character re-appears in the fifth season of Arrow, in the episode "What We Leave Behind". Cassidy rejoined the cast of Arrow as a series regular from season six onward, playing Black Siren. By the end of season 7, Laurel is redeemed and becomes Earth-2's Black Canary. At the beginning of season 8, Laurel returned to Earth-1 as a refugee after Earth-2 was destroyed by antimatter.
 Cassidy also appears as the Earth-X version of Laurel Lance, known as Siren-X, in the season 4 episode of The Flash.
 Caity Lotz portrays Sara Lance, sister of Laurel Lance. The character was originally portrayed by Jacqueline MacInnes Wood in the pilot episode of Arrow, before being recast as a recurring character in subsequent seasons of Arrow. Known as 'The Canary', she is the first Arrowverse character to assume a version of the Black Canary mantle. She uses a sonic scream device. The character is one of the lead characters in the spin-off series Legends of Tomorrow, and also appears in crossover episodes with other shows set in the same universe.
 Alex Kingston portrays Dinah Lance, Laurel and Sara's mother. After Sara's apparent death, Dinah left her husband and moved to Central City. Five years later, she returns to Starling City to make amends with her family and to reveal her theory that Sara is still alive. In season 2, she returns to Starling when Laurel almost overdoses. She is later kidnapped by Nyssa al Ghul and finds out that Sara is indeed alive, reuniting her with her long lost daughter. In season 3, Dinah is informed by Laurel that Sara was murdered, with Laurel promising she will avenge Sara's death. In season 4, Dinah learns that Sara has returned once more after she calls her. She later returns to Star City when Laurel is killed and attends her funeral, learning that she was the Black Canary.
 Evelyn Crawford Sharp (portrayed by Madison McLaughlin), a teenage orphan girl in Star City, masqueraded as Black Canary for some time after Laurel's death to avenge her family's murder by H.I.V.E. until she is stopped by Team Arrow for inadvertently labeling Black Canary as a criminal She later assumes her own mantle of Artemis and joins Oliver's team. However, she later betrays him and aligns herself with Prometheus. Her fate is unknown since the explosion of Lian Yu, in season 5 finale.
 Juliana Harkavy portrays Dinah Drake, introduced in season 5 of Arrow to carry on the Black Canary mantle after Laurel Lance's death in the previous season. A meta-human, she is a former Central City Police Detective who used the name Tina Boland whilst undercover. She gained her sonic scream when the S.T.A.R. Labs Particle Accelerator exploded. She is discovered by Team Arrow in Hub City whilst they are searching for a new Black Canary. After they aid her in taking down the man who murdered her partner/lover, she accepts Oliver's offer. She moves to Star City to become a member of Oliver's new team of recruits, and officially joins the Star City Police Department as a Detective. In season 6, Dinah is seen in a new costume while operating as the Black Canary. She discovers that the crime fighter operating in the city under the alias Vigilante is actually her former partner/lover, Vincent Sobel, who survived his murder because of the particle accelerator explosion and became a meta-human. Dinah initially suspects him because of his association with criminals like Cayden James and Ricardo Diaz but reconciles with him after knowing his true intentions, which leads to a big misunderstanding between her and Team Arrow. Her friendship with them deteriorates after Vince is killed by Earth-2 Laurel, leaving Dinah determined to get revenge for his death which reinforces a split between Oliver and new members of Team Arrow. Dinah branches out along with Rene and Curtis to operate as a new team for a while, but they all get back together in the end to battle Diaz. Dinah makes amends with Oliver and puts aside her hate for Laurel. In season seven, Dinah becomes the captain of the SCPD. She is outed as the Black Canary, when she uses her canary cry to save Mayor Pollard's life. When Dinah has her throat slit by Stanley Dover, she loses her ability to properly perform the canary cry. She later starts using an upgraded version of the sonic canary cry device, previously used by Sara and Earth-1 Laurel. In the fifth part of Crisis on Infinite Earths that led to Earth-1 being merged with Earth-38 and the unnamed Earth from Black Lightning, Dinah's memory was restored by Martian Manhunter. In the episode "Green Arrow & the Canaries," Dinah has relocated to 2040 due to nobody knowing who Black Canary is. She no longer sports the throat injury that Dover gave her. Dinah assists in rescuing Helena Bertinelli's daughter Bianca. Afterwards in the episode "Fadeout," she returns to 2020 where she turns down a promotion, helps to find a younger William, attends Oliver's funeral, and relocates to Metropolis.
 An older Dinah appears in the flash-forwards, set in the year 2040. She is the founder and the leader of a female vigilante group called the "Canary Network".
 Earth-2 Dinah Drake appears in Arrow season 8 episode "Starling City". She is a corrupted SCPD sergeant, who secretly works for Earth-2 Tommy Merlyn / Dark Archer and helps him in his plan to destroy the Glades. She is killed by an anti-matter wave that destroys the entirety of Earth-2.

Animation

Justice League and Justice League Unlimited
In the Justice League episode "Legends", the League teamed up with the Justice Guild of America in an alternate universe. The Guild member Black Siren was based on the Golden Age Black Canary, Dinah Drake. She was voiced by Jennifer Hale. The Siren's real name was given as Donna Nance on her tombstone.

In the sequel series Justice League Unlimited, Black Canary was voiced by Morena Baccarin. She was first seen in a small cameo at the end of "Initiation", where her looks are enough to convince Green Arrow to stay in the League. She first appears as a main character in "The Cat and the Canary". She was vexed because her old mentor, Wildcat, had been obsessively engaging in underground fighting tournaments, and she convinced the smitten Green Arrow to help her convince Wildcat to return to the League. She and Green Arrow start a relationship, as seen in "Double Date", thereby paying homage to their famed romance in the comics. She also started a rivalry with Huntress. This version of Black Canary also appeared in the Justice League Unlimited spin-off comic book.

Batman: The Brave and the Bold

Black Canary appears in Batman: The Brave and the Bold, voiced by Grey DeLisle. She first appears in the episode "Night of the Huntress!", where she and Batman teamed up to stop Solomon Grundy from getting a new brain from a genius. She is Batman's main partner in the musical episode "Mayhem of the Music Meister!". Batman asks her to stay and keep watch of Black Manta, the Clock King, and Gorilla Grodd, after the first encounter with the Music Meister ("I'm The Music Meister"). She follows him instead, to the dismay of Green Arrow. The two fight against Music Meister ("The World is Mine!"), and Black Canary gets controlled again. Black Canary is also featured in the main plot of "The Golden Age of Justice!". Tired of being treated like a kid, Dinah Lance convinces Wildcat to have her help the rest of the Justice Society of America. Her mother, the original Black Canary, is seen in flashbacks, eventually dying after being crushed by debris during a fire. After Wildcat put his regret of being unable to save Dinah Drake behind him, they go off and help the rest of the Justice Society and Batman defeat Per Degaton. She returns in "The Mask of Matches Malone!", as one of the Birds of Prey. She also appeared in Scooby-Doo! & Batman: The Brave and the Bold.

Young Justice
Black Canary appears in Young Justice, voiced by Vanessa Marshall. She is a recurring character and serves as the combat trainer for the members of Young Justice. Series co-creator Greg Weisman has said her role on the show was in part because she is his favorite character in the DC universe. In "Disordered," she holds a therapy session with each of the members of the team after what happened in Martian Manhunter's mind-training exercise. Black Canary's relationship with Green Arrow is touched upon in the series: in "Homefront," Red Tornado mentions he is taking over monitor duty at the Watchtower for Green Arrow because he has "a hot date with Black Canary". In the first-season finale, "Auld Acquaintance," she is brainwashed by Vandal Savage and attacks the kids, only to be knocked unconscious by Robin and Rocket. After being restrained and gagged, she is freed from her mind control and attempts to help the team free the other brainwashed JLA members. At the end of the episode, she and Ollie set out with Red Arrow (who is revealed to be a clone of Roy Harper) to find the real Roy. Black Canary returns in Young Justice: Invasion which is set five years after the previous series. In "Salvage," Black Canary assists Green Arrow, Guardian, Nightwing, and Kid Flash in Red Arrow's intervention where Red Arrow is still trying to find the real Roy Harper through whatever way possible. In Young Justice: Outsiders, set two years after Invasion, episode "Princes All", Black Canary becomes outraged when Batman and Green Arrow take several League and Team members to fight against metahuman trafficking without United Nations scrutiny and refuses Green Arrow's offer to join them. In Young Justice: Phantoms, she begins regular mental health checks on members of the Justice League, Team and Outsiders. Beast Boy is later sent to her for counselling in order to help him cope with his depression following the apparent death of Superboy and helps him to come to terms with his traumas of losing his loved ones in the past. By the end of the season, she attends Miss Martian and Superboy's long awaited wedding and suggests creating a sanctuary for heroes to seek treatment for their mental health struggles.

DC Nation Shorts
Black Canary appears with Green Arrow in the 2014 DC Nation Short: Green Arrow shorts "Brick" and "Onomatopoeiabot", voiced by Kari Wahlgren. Her design is based on her appearance in Smallville.

Mad
Black Canary appears in an episode of Mad, voiced by Tara Strong. She joins the other superheroes in a musical number that asks Superman, Batman, and Wonder Woman about being called "Super Friends." In her part, she stated that she once asked Superman to feed her cat only for Superman to go save the Louvre.

DC Super Hero Girls
Dinah Drake appears as Black Canary in the 2015 DC animated web series DC Super Hero Girls.

Justice League Action
Black Canary makes several cameo appearances in Justice League Action, first in one of Space Cabbie's selfies in the episodes "Selfie Help!" and "Follow That Space Cab!", and later in "Party Animal", attending Green Arrow's Christmas party.

Film

Live action

Jurnee Smollett-Bell portrays Dinah Lance / Black Canary in the 2020 film Birds of Prey (and the Fantabulous Emancipation of One Harley Quinn). Dinah works as a singer in a nightclub owned by Roman Sionis, and ultimately decides to become a vigilante to prevent her boss from going after young thief Cassandra Cain. Her family legacy is discussed when Renee Montoya mentions she worked with Dinah's mother in the Gotham City Police, only for her to reply that seeing her die in the line of duty made Dinah reluctant of also becoming a crime fighter. She displays the metahuman ability of hypersonic screams in the film's climax, which Smollett-Bell likened to Black Canary's attacks in Injustice 2. Smollett-Bell will reprise her role in an upcoming solo spin off movie exclusive for HBO Max.

Animated

Batman Beyond: Return of the Joker
Black Canary makes a cameo in a flashback in Batman Beyond: Return of the Joker.

Justice League: The New Frontier
Both versions of the Black Canary make very brief appearances in Justice League: The New Frontier, the original appearing as a member of the Justice Society of America, while the second Black Canary makes an appearance in the near end of the film amongst Supergirl and the Teen Titans, the next generation of heroes.

DC Showcase: Green Arrow
Black Canary appears in the DC Showcase: Green Arrow. Here, Dinah is heard on her answering machine in the beginning and appears as Black Canary in the end, defeating Count Vertigo using her Canary Cry and is proposed to by Green Arrow. Grey DeLisle reprises her role from Batman: The Brave and the Bold.

Justice League: Crisis on Two Earths
An alternate counterpart of the Black Canary from a parallel Earth, the villain Scream Queen, appears in the animated film Justice League: Crisis on Two Earths, operating under the Crime Syndicate's Johnny Quick, attacking Martian Manhunter with her sonic scream. The Black Canary also makes an appearance later in the film as a recruit in the Justice League teleported to the Watchtower to defend the Watchtower and battle against Superwoman, Captain Super, Captain Super Jr. and Uncle Super. She unleashes her Canary Cry against Superwoman after she attacks Black Lightning, and later knocks out Captain Super Jr. using her power when he is about to defeat Firestorm. Her only line in the film "Wanna hear a secret?" is voiced by actress Kari Wührer.

The Lego Batman Movie
Black Canary is among the heroes present in the Justice League anniversary party, to which Batman has not been invited in The Lego Batman Movie.

Teen Titans GO! To the Movies
Black Canary appeared in Teen Titans Go! To the Movies.

Justice Society: World War II
Black Canary is a main character in Justice Society: World War II, voiced by Elysia Rotaru. She is depicted as younger and new into superheroism, and a member of the Justice Society of America as led by Wonder Woman. It is mentioned that Dinah had been romantically involved with Larry Lance before the events of the movie, wherein she develops a close friendship with Hawkman. After he perishes during a fight against Atlantean forces, Black Canary unleashes her sonic power in retaliation.

Video games

Justice League Heroes
Black Canary appears as a playable character in the PSP version of Justice League Heroes, voiced by Jennifer Hale.

Batman: The Brave and the Bold – The Videogame
Black Canary is a playable support character in Batman: The Brave and the Bold – The Videogame, voiced again by Grey DeLisle.

DC Universe Online
Black Canary appears in DC Universe Online, voiced by Kelley Huston. Players can interact with Black Canary. If the player is on the superhero campaign, they get to fight alongside her. If the player is on the supervillain campaign, they get to fight her. As a bonus, her sonic abilities are able to be bought as a powerful scream or a whirlwind of supersonic energy.

Lego Batman 2: DC Super Heroes
Black Canary appeared in Lego Batman 2: DC Super Heroes, voiced by Kari Wahlgren.

Injustice: Gods Among Us
Black Canary appears in the IOS version of Injustice: Gods Among Us as a support card for Green Arrow. In addition, during the game's story mode Green Arrow carries a picture of Black Canary in his arrow case. There is also concept art that contains multiple ideas for how she would look in the game, suggesting that she may have been planned as a playable character at one point.

Lego Batman 3: Beyond Gotham
Kari Wahlgren reprises her role as Black Canary in Lego Batman 3: Beyond Gotham. Additionally, the Sara Lance version is playable via downloadable content.

Injustice 2
Black Canary appears in Injustice 2 as a playable character, voiced again by Vanessa Marshall. Prior to the game's story, she was absent in the events of the first game as Doctor Fate brought her to an alternate universe before she was killed by Superman, allowing her and an alternate version of Green Arrow to raise their son, Connor. Fate assists the couple in bringing them back to Canary's home world to assist Batman in combating the Society. In the game's story, she and Green Arrow assist Batman and Harley Quinn in taking down a number of members of the Society before they are abducted by Brainiac. They are then mind-controlled by Gorilla Grodd into fighting Aquaman and Black Adam, but are freed after Aquaman kills Grodd.

In her ending, she returns home to see if Connor is safe, only to discover he's developed her metahuman super powers.

In Jay Garrick's intros, he mentions fighting alongside Dinah's mother in the JSA.

Lego DC Super-Villains
Black Canary is a playable character in Lego DC Super-Villains, voiced again by Vanessa Marshall.

Music
In 2016, DC Comics released a three-track EP called EP 1 to promote the comic book, in which Black Canary becomes the lead singer of a band that shares her name.

References

Other media
DC Comics characters in other media